Ring finger protein 157 is a protein that in humans is encoded by the RNF157 gene.

References

Further reading